Russian Turkestan was the western part of Turkestan within the Russian Empire’s Central Asian territories, and was administered as a Krai or Governor-Generalship. It comprised the oasis region to the south of the Kazakh Steppe, but not the protectorates of the Emirate of Bukhara and the Khanate of Khiva.

History

Establishment

Although Russia had been pushing south into the steppes from Astrakhan and Orenburg since the failed Khivan expedition of Peter the Great in 1717, the beginning of the Russian conquest of Turkestan is normally dated to 1865. That year the Russian forces took the city of Tashkent under the leadership of General Mikhail Chernyayev expanding the territories of Turkestan Oblast (part of Orenburg Governorate-General). Chernyayev had exceeded his orders (he only had 3,000 men under his command at the time) but Saint Petersburg recognized the annexation in any case. This was swiftly followed by the conquest of Khodzhent, Dzhizak and Ura-Tyube, culminating in the annexation of Samarkand and the surrounding region on the Zeravshan River from the Emirate of Bukhara in 1868 forming the Zeravsh Special Okrug of Turkestan.

An account of the Russian conquest of Tashkent was written in "Urus leshkerining Türkistanda tarikh 1262–1269 senelarda qilghan futuhlari" by Mullah Khalibay Mambetov.

Expansion

In 1867 Turkestan was made a separate Governor-Generalship, under its first Governor-General, Konstantin Petrovich Von Kaufman. Its capital was Tashkent and it consisted initially of three oblasts (provinces): Syr Darya, Semirechye Oblast and the Zeravshan Okrug (later Samarkand Oblast). To these were added in 1873 the Amu Darya Division, annexed from the Khanate of Khiva, and in 1876 the Fergana Oblast, formed from the remaining rump of the Kokand Khanate that was dissolved after an uprising in 1875. In 1894, the Transcaspian Region (which had been conquered in 1881–1885 by military generals Mikhail Skobelev and Mikhail Annenkov) was added to the Governor-Generalship.

Colonization
The administration of the region had an almost purely military character throughout. Von Kaufman died in 1882, and a committee under Fedor Karlovich Giers (or Girs, brother of the Russian Foreign Minister Nikolay Karlovich Giers) toured the Krai and drew up proposals for reform, which were implemented after 1886. In 1888 the new Trans-Caspian railway, begun at Uzun-Ada on the shores of the Caspian Sea in 1877, reached Samarkand. Nevertheless, Turkestan remained an isolated colonial outpost, with an administration that preserved many distinctive features from the previous Islamic regimes, including Qadis' courts and a 'native' administration that devolved much power to local 'Aksakals' (Elders or Headmen). It was quite unlike European Russia. In 1908 Count Konstantin Konstantinovich Pahlen led another reform commission to Turkestan, which produced in 1909–1910 a monumental report documenting administrative corruption and inefficiency. The Jadid educational reform movement which originated among Tatars spread among Muslims of Central Asia under Russian rule.

A policy of deliberately enforcing anti-modern, traditional, ancient conservative Islamic education in schools and Islamic ideology was enforced by the Russians in order to deliberately hamper and destroy opposition to their rule by keeping them in a state of torpor to and prevent foreign ideologies from penetrating in.

The Russians implemented Turkification upon the Ferghana and Samarkand Tajiks, replacing their language with Uzbek, resulting in a dominantly Uzbek-speaking Samarkand, whereas decades before Tajik Persian was the dominant language in Samarkand.

Basmachi
In 1897 the railway reached Tashkent, and finally in 1906 a direct rail link with European Russia was opened across the steppe from Orenburg to Tashkent. This led to much larger numbers of ethnic Russian settlers flowing into Turkestan than had hitherto been the case, and their settlement was overseen by a specially created Migration Department in Saint Petersburg (Переселенческое Управление). This caused considerable discontent amongst the local population as these settlers took scarce land and water resources away from them. In 1916 discontent boiled over in the Basmachi Revolt, sparked by a decree conscripting the natives into labour battalions (they had previously been exempt from military service). Thousands of settlers were killed, and this was matched by Russian reprisals, particularly against the nomadic population. To escape Russians slaughtering them in 1916, Uzbeks, Kazakhs and Kyrgyz escaped to China. Xinjiang became a sanctuary for fleeing Kazakhs escaping the Russians after the Muslims faced conscription by the Russian government. The Turkmen, Kyrgyz, and Kazakhs were all impacted by the 1916 insurrection caused by the conscription decreed by the Russian government. The corvée conscription issued on June 25, 1916. Order had not really been restored by the time the February Revolution took place in 1917. This would usher in a still bloodier chapter in Turkestan's history, as the Bolsheviks of the Tashkent Soviet launched an attack on the autonomous Jadid government in Kokand early in 1918, which left 14,000 dead. Resistance to the Bolsheviks by the local population (dismissed as 'Basmachi' or 'Banditry' by Soviet historians) continued well into the beginning of the 1930s.

Governors of Turkestan
Turkestan had 21 Governor-generals.

 1865–1867 Mikhail Grigoryevich Chernyaev (Military Governor)
 1866–1867 Dmitri Ilyich Romanovskiy (Civil Governor)
 1867–1881 Konstantin Petrovich von Kaufman
 1881–1882 Gerasim Alexeevich Kolpakovsky
 1882‒4 Mikhail Chernyayev
 1884‒9 Nikolai Rozenbakh
 1889–1898 Alexander Borisovich Vrevsky
 1898–1901 Sergey Mikhailovich Dukhovsky
 1901–1904 Nikolay Alexandrovich Ivanov
 1904–1905 Nikolay Nikolayevich Tevyashev
 1905–1906 Vsevolod Victorovich Zaharov
 1906 Dean Ivanovich Subotich
 1906 Yevgeny Osipovich Matsievsky
 1906–1908 Nikolai Ivanovich Grodekov
 1908–1909 Pavel Ivanovich Mischenko
 1909–1910 Alexander Vasilyevich Samsonov
 1910–1911 Vasiliy Ivanovich Pokotilo
 1911–1914 Alexander Vasilyevich Samsonov (restored)
 1914–1916 Fedor Vladimirovich Martson
 1916 Mikhail Romanovich Yerofeyev
 1916–17 Aleksey Kuropatkin

Administrative division
Turkestan was divided into five oblasts.
 Fergana Oblast (New Margelan (Skobelev)) (part of Kokand Khanate until 1876)
 Samarkand Oblast (Samarkand) (until 1886 Zeravshan Okrug, the occupied east territories of Khanate of Bukhara)
 Semirechye Oblast (Verny) (1882–1899 part of the Governor-Generalship of the Steppes)
 Syr-Darya Oblast (Tashkent)
 Transcaspian Oblast (Askhabat) (until 1898 part of Caucasus Governorate-General)

Soviet rule

After the Russian Revolution of 1917, a Turkestan Autonomous Soviet Socialist Republic (Turkestan ASSR) within the Russian Socialist Federative Soviet Republic was created in Soviet Central Asia (excluding modern-day Kazakhstan). After the foundation of the Soviet Union it was split into the Turkmen Soviet Socialist Republic (Turkmenistan) and Uzbek Soviet Socialist Republic (Uzbekistan) in 1924. The Tajik Soviet Socialist Republic (Tajikistan) was formed out of part of the Uzbek SSR in 1929, and in 1936 the Kyrgyz SSR (Kyrgyzstan) was separated from Kazakh Soviet Socialist Republic. After the collapse of the Soviet Union, these republics gained their independence.

See also
National delimitation in Soviet Central Asia
Orenburg Cossacks
Semirechye Cossacks
Turkestan Military District
History of Uzbekistan
History of Kyrgyzstan
History of Turkmenistan
History of Kazakhstan
History of Tajikistan

References

Further reading
Pierce, Richard A. Russian Central Asia, 1867–1917 : a study in colonial rule (1960) online free to borrow
Daniel Brower Turkestan and the Fate of the Russian Empire (London) 2003
Wheeler, Geoffrey. The modern history of Soviet Central Asia (1964). online free to borrow
Eugene Schuyler Turkistan (London) 1876 2 Vols. online free
G.N. Curzon Russia in Central Asia (London) 1889 online free
Count K.K. Pahlen Mission to Turkestan (Oxford) 1964
Seymour Becker Russia's Protectorates in Central Asia, Bukhara and Khiva 1865–1924 (Cambridge, Massachusetts) 1968
Adeeb Khalid The Politics of Muslim Cultural Reform: Jadidism in Central Asia (Berkeley) 1997
T.K. Beisembiev The Life of Alimqul (London) 2003
Hisao Komatsu, The Andijan Uprising Reconsidered a: Symbiosis and Conflict in Muslim Societies: Historical and Comparative Perspectives, ed. by Tsugitaka Sato, Londres, 2004.
Aftandil Erkinov. Praying For and Against the Tsar: Prayers and Sermons in Russian-Dominated Khiva and Tsarist Turkestan.Berlin: Klaus Schwarz Verlag, 2004 (=ANOR 16), 112 p.
Aftandil S.Erkinov. The Andijan Uprising of 1898 and its leader Dukchi-ishan described by contemporary Poets'' TIAS Central Eurasian Research Series No.3. Tokyo, 2009, 118 p.
Malikov, Azim. Russian policy toward Islamic “sacred lineages” of Samarkand province of Turkestan Governor-Generalship in 1868-1917 in Acta Slavica Iaponica no 40. 2020, p.193-216

External links

Subdivisions of the Russian Empire
Former Russian colonies
Russian Turkestan
1860s establishments in the Russian Empire
Governorates-General of the Russian Empire
Russian
1867 establishments in the Russian Empire
1918 disestablishments in Russia